The Roman Catholic Diocese of Tenancingo (erected 26 November 2009) is a suffragan diocese of the Archdiocese of Toluca.

Ordinaries
Raúl Gómez González (2009–2022)

Episcopal See
Tenancingo, State of Mexico

External links and references

Tenancingo
Christian organizations established in 2009
Roman Catholic dioceses and prelatures established in the 21st century
Tenancingo, Roman Catholic Diocese of